Hendrik Gustaaf "Hans" Fokker (February 18, 1900, Rotterdam – July 2, 1943, Thanbyuzayat) was a sailor from the Netherlands, who represented his native country at the 1928 Summer Olympics in Amsterdam. Fokker as crew member on the Dutch 6 Metre Kemphaan took the 4th place with helmsman Hans Pluijgers and fellow crew members: Carl Huisken, Wim Schouten and Roeffie Vermeulen.

Hans died of a tropical disease in 1943 in Thanbyuzayat during internment in Burma.

References

Sources
 
 
 

1900 births
1943 deaths
World War II prisoners of war held by Japan
Dutch male sailors (sport)

Sportspeople from Rotterdam
Sailors at the 1928 Summer Olympics – 6 Metre
Olympic sailors of the Netherlands
Prisoners who died in Japanese detention
Dutch people who died in prison custody
Infectious disease deaths in Myanmar
Dutch civilians killed in World War II